Aging in cats is the process by which cats change over the course of their natural lifespans. As cats age, they undergo changes in health and behavior. Dental disease and loss of olfaction are common as cats age, affecting eating habits. Arthritis and sarcopenia are other common effects of aging in cats. The average lifespan of a cat may range from 10 to 13 years. How a cat's health is affected by aging may be managed through modifications in a cat's diet, accessibility adjustments, and cognitive stimulation.

Average lifespan among domestic cats 
The average lifespan of domestic cats has increased in recent decades. It has risen from seven years in the 1980s, to nine years in 1995, to about 15 years in 2021. Reliable information on the lifespans of domestic cats is varied and limited. Nevertheless, a number of studies have investigated the matter and have come up with noteworthy estimates. Estimates of mean lifespan in these studies range between 13 and 20 years, with a single value in the neighborhood of 15 years. At least one study found a median lifespan value of 14 years and a corresponding interquartile range of 9 to 17 years. Maximum lifespan has been estimated at values ranging from 22 to 30 years although there have been claims of cats living longer than 30 years. According to the 2010 edition of the Guinness World Records, the oldest cat ever recorded was Creme Puff, who died in 2005, aged 38 years, 3 days. Female cats typically outlive male cats, and crossbred cats typically outlive purebred cats. It has also been found that the greater a cat's weight, the lower its life expectancy on average.

A common misconception in cat aging (and dog aging) is that a cat ages the equivalent of what a human would age in seven years each year. This is inaccurate due to the inconsistencies in aging as well as there being far more accurate equations to predict a cat's age in "cat years". A more accurate equation often used by veterinarians to predict cat years is 4x + 16, (x being the chronological age of the cat) which works for cats who are two years of age or older.

In one study of cat mortality, the most frequent causes were trauma (12.2%), renal disorder (12.1%), non-specific illness (11.2%), neoplasia (10.8%) and mass lesion disorders (10.2%).

Signs of aging 
Being aware of the changes in pets' needs and abilities allows for gracefully aging assistance from pet owners. Hannah Harper, associate editor of Health Magazine, describes five major points to ease the transition of aging pets. Step one is an increase in vet visits. Director of Behavior Services at MSPCA, Terri Bright PhD, encourages “taking note of your pet’s abilities so you can catch progressing conditions”. These changes may include both behavioral and physiological changes.  Vet visits should increase to twice a year and be focused on tracking mobility and monitoring full body health. Step two is making lifestyle adjustments. Aging pets may experience arthritis, causing difficulty with necessary mobility involved in jumping, running, walking, and bending. Household adjustments may need to be made to fit the needs of the animal. This may include more accessible bedding, litter boxes, and feeding locations– floor level. Step three is mental engagement. Like humans, pets also experience cognitive decline with age. The most effective way to slow this decline is with mental engagement. Harper suggests toys such as puzzles that “encourage your dog or cat to ‘solve’ a problem” or toys/games that “tap into their hunter-prey drive. Step four is to anticipate behavioral changes. New behaviors may develop with aging including aggression and anxiety, often related to the physical changes your pet is experiencing. Step five is to consider alternative therapies. This step is meant for pets struggling with joint pain or arthritis and seeking pain management. Suggested therapies include aqua therapy, massages, acupuncture, as well as taking oral supplements.

Nutrition 
Aging in cats impacts their nutritional behavior. Various areas in the feline aging process can affect nutrition. This includes reduced food intake and decreased nutritional absorption. There is a correlation between increasing age and dental disease in cats. This oral discomfort affects the amount of food felines consume. The key to preventing oral pain from dental disease is oral examinations and early appropriate intervention.”   Arthritis in older cats may also restrict mobility and discomfort when feeding. Olfaction loss with aging can also impact a feline's food intake. There are many factors discussed in the article that led to reduced food intake. Their second focus is decreased nutritional absorption. They provide evidence suggesting that “older cats have decreased fat and protein digestion and if this loss is not accounted for cats will begin to metabolize their lean body mass leading to sarcopenia." Cats that can preserve their lean body mass have increased longevity. Because of this, dietary manipulation can have positive effects in feline longevity.

References 

Cat health
Senescence in non-human organisms